Darby End Halt  was a station on the former Great Western Railway's  Bumble Hole Line between  and .

It opened in 1905 and closed in 1964, as part of the Beeching Axe.

References

Further reading

Disused railway stations in Dudley
Railway stations in Great Britain opened in 1905
Railway stations in Great Britain closed in 1964
Beeching closures in England
Former Great Western Railway stations